Stephanie Vogt and Jirka Lokaj won in the final 6–2, 6–1 in the final against Claudine Schaul and Mike Vermeer.

Seeds

 Stephanie Vogt / Jirka Lokaj (champions)
 Claudine Schaul / Mike Vermeer (final)

Draw

References
Main Draw

Tennis at the 2011 Games of the Small States of Europe